Julien Touxagas (born 12 February 1984 in Perpignan, France) is a French former professional rugby league footballer. He most recently played for the Catalans Dragons in the Super League competition.

Career
He fell out of favour at Les Catalans at the back end of 2007, a year in which he appeared in the Challenge Cup Final at Wembley Stadium. During 2008, he forced his way back into the side, making a number of appearances and notably scoring a 90-metre try in Cardiff, against Harlequins RL

He was named in the France training squad for the 2008 Rugby League World Cup.
Touxagas continued to represent France in the 2009 Four Nations tournament.

References

External links
Super League profile

1984 births
Living people
Catalans Dragons players
France national rugby league team players
French rugby league players
Rugby league centres
Rugby league locks
Rugby league second-rows
Sportspeople from Perpignan